This list of tunnels in Spain includes any road, rail or waterway tunnel in Spain.

Guadarrama Tunnel (28,377 m Railway-AVE)
Pajares Base Tunnel (24,667 m Railway-AVE, under construction)
M-30 / Calle-30 By-pass Sur (12,000 m Road)
M-50/M-61 Tunel del Pardo (11,500 m Road, project)
Tunnels de San Pedro (8,930 m Railway-AVE)
Tunnel del Somport (8,608 m Road)
Perthus Tunnel (8,350 m Railway-AVE, under construction)
Tunnel del AVE in Vigo (8,100 m Railway-AVE, under construction)
Tunnel del Somport (7,710 m Railway)
Tunnels del Abdalajís (7,300 m Railway-AVE)
Tunnel de la Risa II (7,700 m Railway)
Tunnel de la Risa III (7,500 m Railway + AVE, under construction)
Tunnel de la Risa I (7,300 m Railway)
Tunnels del Ave in Valencia (7,000 m Railway-AVE, under construction)
Engaña Tunnel (6,976m - never used)
Tunnel Sants-Sagrera (5,640 m Railway-AVE, under construction)
(Viella I) Alfonso XIII Tunnel (5,230 m Road, semi-closed)
(Viella II) Juan Carlos I Tunnel (5,240 m Road)
Túnel del Cadí (5,026 m Road)
Tunnel de Paracuellos (4,672 m Railway-AVE)
Tunnel del Bracons (4,500 m Road)
Negrón Tunnel (4,144 m Road) 
Tunnel de Somosierra (3,895 m Railway)
Tunnel de Isuskitza (3,377 m Road)
AP-6 Guadarrama nº2 (3,340 m Road)
AP-6 Guadarrama nº3 (3,148 m Road)
Tunnel de Bielsa-Aragnouet (3,070 m Road)
Tunnel de Soller (3,023 m Road)
Tunnel del Monrepós (2,900 m Road, under construction)
AP-6 Guadarrama nº1 (2,870 m Road)
Tunnel de la Hechicera (2,835 m Railway-AVE)
M-111 Madrid-Aeropuerto (2,600 m Road) 
Tunnel de Piqueras (2,598 m Road)
Tunnel de Vallvidrera (2,517 m Road)
Tunnel de Pedralba (2,444 m Road)
M-30 By-pass Norte-Pio XII

See also
List of tunnels by location

Spain
 
Tunnels
Tunnels